Farm to Market Roads in Texas are owned and maintained by the Texas Department of Transportation (TxDOT).

RM 2600

FM 2600

The highway was cancelled on July 25, 1963, with the mileage being transferred to FM 1170.

FM 2601

Farm to Market Road 2601 (FM 2601) is located in Bell County.

FM 2601 begins at an intersection with Moody-Leon Road / Buckhorn Lane in Meador Grove. The highway travels in a generally eastern direction, turning south at Munz Road, before turning back east at FM 2409. FM 2601 continues to run in an eastern direction, ending at an intersection with SH 317.

FM 2601 was designated on November 24, 1959, along the current route.

Junction list

FM 2602

FM 2603

FM 2604

FM 2605

Farm to Market Road 2605 (FM 2605), known locally as Tenneryville Road, runs from FM 1845 in Longview west to Whatley Road in White Oak.

FM 2605 was designated on November 24, 1959, along its current route. On June 27, 1995, FM 2605 was redesignated Urban Road 2605 (UR 2605). The designation reverted to FM 2605 with the elimination of the Urban Road system on November 15, 2018.

FM 2606

Farm to Market Road 2606 (FM 2606) is located in Clay County.

FM 2606 is a two-lane route for its entire length. Its western terminus is at  FM 1954 near the entrance to Lake Arrowhead State Park. The route travels to the east, past the north edge of Lake Arrowhead and across the Wichita Falls Dam on a load-zoned bridge. It winds around the northeastern edge of the lake before veering to the northeast at an intersection with Bunny Run Road. The route turns to the east near its eastern terminus at  FM 2847, which provides access to Henrietta.

The current FM 2606 was designated on November 16, 1968. The original route was the section from FM 2847 to the east edge of the bridge across the Wichita Falls Dam. The designation was extended across the dam and to FM 1954 on September 26, 1979.

FM 2606 (1959)

The first FM 2606 was designated in Rusk County on November 24, 1959, from SH 322 in Elderville to FM 1716; that route was canceled on February 23, 1960, with the mileage transferred to FM 2011.

FM 2606 (1960)

The second FM 2606 was designated in Williamson County from US 81 northeast 5.6 miles; it was designated on September 27, 1960. On July 24, 1961, the east end was relocated, adding 0.2 miles; that designation was cancelled on June 2, 1967, when it was combined with FM 971.

FM 2607

FM 2608

FM 2609

Farm to Market Road 2609 (FM 2609) is located in Nacogdoches County.

FM 2609 begins at an intersection with US 59 / Loop 224 in Nacogdoches. The highway travels in an eastern direction along Austin Street, running through more rural areas of the city's northwest side. Between Future Bus. I-69/Bus. US 59 and FM 1275, FM 2609 travels near the northern end of Stephen F. Austin State University. Northeast of the university, the highway travels through areas that are more residential and suburban on the city's northeast side. FM 2609 intersects Loop 224 a second time, then leaves the city, with the route becoming more rural. The highway enters the town of Appleby and has a brief overlap with FM 941. After leaving Appleby, FM 2609 travels in a more eastern direction through rural farming areas, with state maintenance ending just west of County Road 266 / County Road 273; the roadway continues east as Cedar Bluff Road.

FM 2609 was designated on November 24, 1959, from FM 1878 northeast to FM 941. The old route south to FM 1878 was requested by the Nacogdoches County to be renumbered on March 7, 1960, when the county accepted the relocation of FM 2609, and on March 21, 1960, the old route was designated as FM 1411. On May 7, 1970, the highway was extended northeast  from FM 941, also creating a concurrency with FM 941. On September 26, 1979, FM 2609 was extended northeast  to its current end. On July 29, 1987, FM 2609 was extended west to US 59, completing its current routing.

Junction list

FM 2610

Farm to Market Road 2610 (FM 2610) is located in Polk and Liberty counties. The communities of Ace and Romayor lie along its route.

The road was extended south to SH 105 (now FM 787) on September 20, 1961.

FM 2611

Farm to Market Road 2611 (FM 2611) is located in Brazoria and Matagorda counties.

FM 2611 begins where FM 2004 ends at SH 36 near Jones Creek. The road follows a western path, crossing the San Bernard River and passing the Churchill Bridge Community. The highway intersects FM 2918, an access highway to the River's End Community and the San Bernard Wildlife Refuge. FM 2611 ends at an intersection with FM 457, which connects Sargent to Bay City.

FM 2611 was designated on November 24, 1959, from SH 36 southwest to what is now FM 2918. On May 2, 1962, FM 2611 was extended southwest to FM 457, replacing FM 2541.

Junction list

FM 2612

Farm to Market Road 2612 (FM 2612) is located in Cass County in the town of Hughes Springs.

FM 2612 begins at an intersection with FM 250. The highway travels in an eastern direction, intersects FM 161, then turns northeast at County Road 2986 / 2990, before ending at an intersection with SH 11 / SH 49. FM 2612 acts as a bypass through the southern part of the town.

The current FM 2612 was designated on August 31, 1981, running from FM 250 eastward to the intersection of SH 11 / SH 49.

Junction list

FM 2612 (1959)

The highway was extended  northeastward and southeastward to SH 87 on May 2, 1962, creating a loop through Port Bolivar. The highway was cancelled and re-designated as Loop 108 on March 26, 1980.

FM 2613

FM 2613 (1959)

The original FM 2613 was designated on November 24, 1959, from US 90 southward  to FM 526. This was cancelled on September 18, 1961, and mileage was transferred to FM 526.

FM 2614

Farm to Market Road 2614 (FM 2614) is located in Colorado and Wharton counties. The two-lane highway begins at FM 102 at Bonus, heads generally west through Elm Grove and ends at FM 950 to the northeast of Garwood.

FM 2614 is a two-lane highway along its entire route. The road begins at a stop sign on FM 102 near Bonus and follows a curving path to the southeast. At a distance  from the start, FM 2614 intersects with Reynolds Road. Starting at this point, the highway begins to change direction so that it heads west-northwest until it reaches Foote Lane. In the  stretch from Reynolds Road to Foote Lane, FM 2614 passes through Elm Grove and then crosses into Colorado County.

FM 2614 was designated on November 24, 1959, along its current route.

FM 2615

FM 2616

FM 2617

RM 2618

Ranch to Market Road 2618 (RM 2618) is located in Mason County.

RM 2618 begins at an intersection with RM 386 north of Mason. The highway travels in an eastern direction through rural and hilly ranching areas, with state maintenance ending just east of RM 1900; the roadway continues as Fly Gap Road.

The highway was extended  eastward on March 5, 1976.

FM 2618 (1959)

The first FM 2618 was designated on November 24, 1959, from FM 111 (now FM 60) at Deanville south  to a road intersection;  were a replacement of FM 111 Spur. On September 27, 1960, the road was extended south  to a county road. On June 28, 1963, the road was extended north  to a county road. FM 2618 was cancelled on December 16, 1969, and transferred to FM 111.

FM 2618 (1970)

The highway was cancelled and combined with FM 93 on January 31, 1974.

FM 2619

FM 2620

Farm to Market Road 2620 (FM 2620) is located in Grimes County. It runs from FM 1696 in Bedias to SH 30 near Shiro.

On February 21, 1961, the northern terminus was moved to FM 1696. Nine months later the road was extended south  to SH 30, 3 miles northeast of Shiro, replacing FM 2677.

FM 2621

FM 2622

Farm to Market Road 2622 (FM 2622) is located in Denton County.

FM 2622 begins at an intersection with Old Stoney Road in Stony. The highway travels in a generally northern direction through residential and farming areas, ending at an intersection with US 380.

FM 2622 was designated on November 24, 1959, from SH 24 (now US 380) southward to Stony.

FM 2623

Farm to Market Road 2623 (FM 2623) is located in Guadalupe County. The highway connects SH 123 in Geronimo  eastward to FM 20.

The current FM 2623 was designated on June 28, 1963, from SH 123 eastward to FM 20.

FM 2623 (1959)

The original FM 2623 was designated on November 24, 1959, from FM 544 west of Plano south  to the Dallas County line. FM 2623 was cancelled on June 25, 1962, and removed from the state highway system in exchange for extending FM 2551. This was later restored as FM 3193, but that was given to the cities of Plano and Dallas on May 25, 1991.

FM 2624

FM 2625

Farm to Market Road 2625 (FM 2625) is located in Harrison County.

FM 2625 begins at an intersection with FM 968 / FM 450 south of Hallsville. The highway travels in a southern / southeastern direction, turning east at a private county road, intersects FM 3251 near the Brandy Branch Reservoir, then intersects SH 43 near the Cave Springs Cemetery. FM 2625 continues to run in an eastern direction through forested areas and rural farm land, ending at an intersection with FM 9 southwest of Waskom.

The highway was extended  eastward to FM 31 on May 2, 1962. The highway was extended  eastward on November 5, 1971. FM 2625 was extended  eastward to a point near Stricklin Springs on November 3, 1972. The highway was extended  eastward to FM 9 on September 5, 1973. FM 2625 was extended westward to FM 968 / FM 450 over part of FM 3251 on October 22, 1982.

Junction list

FM 2626

RM 2627

Ranch to Market Road 2627 (RM 2627) is located in Brewster County.

The southern terminus of RM 2627 is at the currently-closed La Linda International Bridge across the Rio Grande.

The current RM 2627 was designated on June 28, 1963. The route originally ran from US 385 to the southeast . The route was extended to its current terminus on May 6, 1964.

FM 2627

A previous route designated Farm to Market Road 2627 (FM 2627) was established in Cass County on November 24, 1959, running from US 59 in Linden eastward  to a road intersection near Center Hill. On September 27, 1960, the route was extended eastward to FM 248 in Bivins. FM 2627's mileage was transferred to FM 1841 on September 18, 1962.

FM 2628

Farm to Market Road 2628 (FM 2628) is located in Walker County. It runs from FM 247 north of Huntsville to FM 980.

FM 2628 was designated on December 14, 1977, on its current route.

FM 2628 (1959)

FM 2628 was cancelled on December 17, 1969, and became a portion of FM 255 (now RE 255).

FM 2628 (1970)

The next use of the FM 2628 designation was in Freestone County, from FM 489 at Lanely to a point . FM 2628 was cancelled on October 31, 1977, and became a portion of FM 1848.

FM 2629

Farm to Market Road 2629 (FM 2629) is located in Hidalgo, Cameron and Willacy counties in the Lower Rio Grande Valley.

FM 2629 begins at an intersection with FM 491 northeast of La Villa. The highway travels in an eastern direction, intersecting FM 1425 on the Hidalgo-Cameron county line. FM 2629 intersects FM 2845 south of Zapata Ranch, then has an overlap with FM 506 and Spur 413 through the town of Sebastian. The highway turns south just east of I-69E / US 77, then turns back east at County Line Road, running along the Cameron-Willacy county line, ending at an intersection with FM 507.

The highway was extended  eastward to FM  507 on May 5, 1966.

Junction list

RM 2630

RM 2631

FM 2632

FM 2633

FM 2634

Farm to Market Road 2634 (FM 2634) is located in Montague County.

FM 2634 begins at an intersection with FM 103, heading east to an intersection with FM 3428. The highway then intersects FM 2953 and heads southeast. FM 2634 curves eastward before ending at Weldon Robb Park on Lake Nocona.

FM 2634 was designated on January 31, 1961, on the current route.

Junction list

FM 2634 (1959)

FM 2634 was first designated on November 24, 1959, for a road in Comanche County running from SH 36 in Comanche northeast . On October 14, 1960, the FM 2634 designation on this road was replaced with FM 1689.

FM 2635

FM 2636

FM 2636 (1959)

FM 2636 was cancelled on October 17, 1960, and transferred to FM 1576.

FM 2637

Farm to Market Road 2637 (FM 2637) is located in El Paso County, in the city of El Paso.

FM 2637 begins at an intersection with FM 2529 (McCombs Street) in the northern part of the city. The roadway travels east before ending at a dead end.

FM 2637 was designated on November 24, 1959, along its current route.

FM 2638

FM 2639

FM 2640

FM 2641

Farm to Market Road 2641 (FM 2641) is located in the Lubbock metropolitan area. It is known locally as Regis Street.

FM 2641 begins at an intersection with FM 2130 south of Roundup. The highway travels east before intersecting FM 2378 and crossing into Lubbock County. FM 2641 continues traveling east and intersects with FM 179 and U.S. Highway 84 (US 84) near Shallowater. The highway has an intersection with FM 2525 (N. Frankford Avenue) and FM 1264 (N. University Avenue) before entering the city limits of Lubbock. FM 2641 crosses Interstate 27 (I-27) and US 87 and runs just south of Lubbock Preston Smith International Airport before leaving the city limits. The highway ends at an intersection with US 62/US 84 and SH 114 just east of the city.

The current FM 2641 was designated on September 20, 1961, running from FM 2130 to US 84. The highway was further extended east on July 11, 1968, to US 87 (later I-27) and later to US 62/US 82/SH 114 (Idalou Road) on September 5, 1973. On June 27, 1995, the section of FM 2641 from FM 1264 to Idalou Road was redesignated Urban Road 2641 (UR 2641). The designation reverted to FM 2641 with the elimination of the Urban Road system on November 15, 2018.

Junction list

FM 2641 (1959)

The highway was cancelled on October 18, 1960, with the mileage being transferred to FM 656.

FM 2642

FM 2643

FM 2644

FM 2645

FM 2646

Farm to Market Road 2646 (FM 2646) is located in Hockley County.

FM 2646 begins at an intersection with FM 1585. The highway travels in a northern direction through rural areas, intersecting SH 114 between Opdyke West and Smyer. FM 2646 continues to travel through rural areas, ending at an intersection with FM 1294.

The highway was extended  northward from SH 116 to FM 1294 on June 28, 1963.

Junction list

FM 2647

FM 2648

FM 2649

Farm to Market Road 2649 (FM 2649) is located in Hunt County.

FM 2649 begins at an intersection with FM 1567. The highway travels in a northern direction through rural farming areas, ending at an intersection with the eastbound frontage road of I-30 between Campbell and Cumby.

The current FM 2649 was designated on June 28, 1963, from FM 1567 northward to I-30.

FM 2649 (1960)

The highway was cancelled on May 25, 1962, with the mileage being transferred to FM 1198.

FM 2650

Farm to Market Road 2650 (FM 2650) is located in Archer and Wichita counties.

FM 2650 begins at an intersection with FM 1954. The highway travels in a northern direction through a semi-suburban area and crosses over Lake Wichita. FM 2650 enters Wichita Falls in the Allendale area, has an overlap with FM 368, then ends at a junction with US 82 / US 277 / Bus. US 277. The section of highway south of FM 369 is known locally as Sisk Road, while north of FM 369 it is known as Allendale Road.

The highway was extended  northward from FM 368 to US 82 on May 7, 1974. On June 27, 1995, the section of FM 2650 between FM 368 and US 82 was redesignated Urban Road 2650 (UR 2650). The designation reverted to FM 2650 with the elimination of the Urban Road system on November 15, 2018.

Junction list

FM 2651

FM 2652

FM 2653

Farm to Market Road 2653 (FM 2653) is located in Hopkins County.

FM 2653 begins at an intersection with FM 275 north of Miller Grove. The highway travels in an eastern direction, turning north at County Road 1152, then briefly runs in a northeastern direction at County Road 1127. FM 2653 continues to alternate between running in an eastern and northern direction until reaching Brasher, having a short overlap with US 67 through the town, then having a junction with I-30 just outside of the town. The highway turns northwest at County Road 4715, turning back north near SH 11. FM 2653 continues to travel in a northern direction through rural farming areas, ending at an intersection with FM 71.

FM 2653 was designated on October 13, 1960, traveling from FM 71 southward to US 67 at Brashear at a distance of  replacing a portion of FM 71.

Junction list

RM 2654

FM 2655

RM 2655

The highway was cancelled on March 10, 1964, with the mileage being transferred to RM 687.

FM 2656

FM 2657

Farm to Market Road 2657 (FM 2657) is located in Burnet and Lampasas counties.

FM 2657 begins in Briggs at an intersection with Loop 308, the old alignment of US 183 through the community. The route runs briefly to the northeast and then to the north through unincorporated Burnet County. It has an intersection with RM 963 before entering southern Lampasas County. FM 2657 ends at an intersection with US 190 in Copperas Cove, just west of the Coryell County line.

FM 2657 was designated on May 5, 1992, when RM 2657 was re-designated as a farm to market road.

Junction list

FM 2657 (1960)

The first FM 2657 was designated in Gregg County on September 27, 1960, from SH 26 (now US 259) to the Harrison County line. On May 2, 1962, the route was extended east to FM 2208 in Harrison County. On October 17, 1966, that route became part of FM 449.

RM 2657

RM 2657 became part of the state highway system on June 2, 1967, replacing the southern section of RM 963 to Briggs and the northern section of FM 2808 to Copperas Cove. The highway was re-designated as FM 2657 on May 5, 1992.

FM 2658

FM 2659

FM 2660

FM 2661

Farm to Market Road 2661 (FM 2661) is located in Smith County. The  route runs from SH 64 at its northern terminus to SH 155 at its southern terminus; from that point it continues southward as FM 344. It intersects SH 31 about midway in its routing.

The road passes along the eastern side of Lake Palestine and mainly serves as the route to Holiday Inn Vacation Club's The Villages timeshare resort as well as Pine Cove, a popular Christian camp.

FM 2661 was designated on September 27, 1960, from SH 64 to SH 31. On August 2, 1968, FM 2661 was extended south to SH 155.

FM 2662

FM 2662 (1960)

The original FM 2662 was designated on September 27, 1960, from SH 63 in Zavalla north  to 0.6 mile north of Pophers Creek. FM 2662 was cancelled on October 14, 1964, and transferred to FM 2109.

FM 2663

FM 2664

FM 2665

FM 2666

FM 2667

FM 2668

FM 2669

FM 2670

FM 2671

FM 2672

FM 2673

FM 2674

FM 2675

FM 2675 (1960)

The original FM 2675 was designated on September 27, 1960, from SH 123, 0.9 mile south of Zorn, west  to County Road. FM 2675 was cancelled on May 28, 1961, and transferred to FM 1101.

FM 2676

FM 2677

FM 2677 (1960)

The original FM 2677 was designated on September 27, 1960, from SH 45 (now SH 30), 3 miles northeast of Shiro, north 3.6 miles to a road intersection. FM 2677 was cancelled on October 31, 1961, and transferred to FM 2620.

FM 2678

FM 2679

FM 2680

FM 2680 (1960)

The original FM 2680 was designated on September 27, 1960, from SH 11 in Leesburg northwest  to a county road 1.8 miles north of Newsome. On September 20, 1961, the road was extended northwest to FM 1448. FM 2680 was cancelled on October 9, 1961, and transferred to FM 1519.

FM 2681

FM 2681 (1960)

The original FM 2681 was designated on September 27, 1960, from FM 71 at Wilkinson, south  to a county road. FM 2681 was cancelled on May 25, 1962, and transferred to FM 1402.

FM 2682

FM 2683

FM 2684

FM 2685

FM 2686

FM 2687

FM 2688

FM 2689

RM 2690

FM 2691

RM 2692

FM 2692

FM 2692 was cancelled on May 24, 1962, and transferred to FM 2318.

FM 2693

FM 2694

FM 2695

RM 2695

The original RM 2695 was designated on February 22, 1961, from a point at near the intersection of SH 273/US 66 at McLean south  to a county road 5 miles south of the Gray/Donley County line. The road was extended south  on May 2, 1962, and south another  to SH 203 on June 26, 1962. On November 1, 1962, the southern terminus was relocated to SH 203, 6 miles northeast of Hedley, shortening the route  miles, but  were added back on June 2, 1964, when the southern terminus was moved to SH 203 1.5 miles east of Hedley. RM 2695 was cancelled on August 29, 1990, and transferred to SH 273.

FM 2696

FM 2697

FM 2698

Farm to Market Road 2698 (FM 2698) is located in Swisher County.

FM 2698 begins at a junction with I-27 / US 87 in a rural part of the county. The highway travels in an eastern direction through rural, unincorporated areas of the county, passes the Wrangler Feedyards, ending at an intersection with FM 146 north of Tulia.

FM 2698 was designated on September 20, 1961, along the current route.

RM 2699

Notes

References

+26
Farm to market roads 2600
Farm to Market Roads 2600